Bimol Singh (born 11 November 1991) is an Indian cricketer. He made his first-class debut for Manipur in the 2018–19 Ranji Trophy on 28 November 2018. He made his List A debut on 1 March 2021, for Manipur in the 2020–21 Vijay Hazare Trophy.

References

External links
 

1991 births
Living people
Indian cricketers
Place of birth missing (living people)
Manipur cricketers